HMS B3 was one of 11 B-class submarines built for the Royal Navy in the first decade of the 20th century. The boat survived the First World War and was sold for scrap in 1919.

Design and description
The B class was an enlarged and improved version of the preceding A class. They displaced  on the surface and  submerged. The B-class submarines had a crew of two officers and thirteen ratings.

For surface running, the boats were powered by a single 16-cylinder  Vickers petrol engine that drove one propeller shaft. When submerged the propeller was driven by a  electric motor. They could reach  on the surface and  underwater.

The boats were armed with two 18-inch (450 mm) torpedo tubes in the bow. They could carry a pair of reload torpedoes, but generally did not as they would have to remove an equal weight of fuel in compensation.

Construction and career
B3 was laid down by Vickers at their Barrow-in-Furness shipyard, launched 31 October 1905 and completed 19 January 1906. When the war began in 1914, the boat was assigned to defend the Straits of Dover and was then transferred to Scotland in 1915 to defend various ports there. B3 was sold for scrap on 20 December 1919.

Notes

References
 
 
 
 
 

 

British B-class submarines
World War I submarines of the United Kingdom
Ships built in Barrow-in-Furness
Royal Navy ship names
1905 ships